Banded damselfish is a common name for several fishes and may refer to:

Abudefduf abdominalis, native to the eastern central Pacific
Dischistodus fasciatus, in the genus Dischistodus, native to the western Pacific